Sheree Sample-Hughes is an American politician who is the Speaker pro tempore of the Maryland House of Delegates and serves as a Delegate to the Maryland General Assembly representing legislative district 37A in Dorchester and Wicomico Counties on Maryland's eastern shore.

Personal life 
Sample-Hughes was born on September 13, 1977 and attended Parkside High School in Salisbury, Maryland. She went on to earn a bachelor's degree in public relations from Delaware State University and a master's degree in public administration from Wilmington University. Sample-Hughes worked as an affordable housing coordinator for the City of Pocomoke and later as a staffer in the Governor's Office of Service and Volunteerism. She has been involved in a number of community organizations including the local chapter of the NAACP, Alpha Kappa Alpha sorority, the Charles Chipman Cultural Center, and the Wicomico County Democratic Club. In 2006, she was appointed to the Commission on Correctional Standards and served in that capacity until 2014.

Political career 
In 2006, Sample-Hughes successfully sought election to the Wicomico County Council, representing the 1st council district. She would serve as Vice President of the Council in 2009 and 2010, and during her time on the Council served on the board of trustees of the Wicomico County Free Library, as a member of the Social Services Advisory Board, as a member of the Tri-County Council for the Lower Eastern Shore, and on the Board of Directors of Salisbury-Wicomico Economic Development, Incorporated.

Following the retirement of Rudolph C. Cane from the Maryland House of Delegates in 2014, Sample-Hughes ran to replace him. She was uncontested in both the primary and general elections.

In the Legislature
Upon being sworn into the legislature in January, 2015, Sample-Hughes was appointed to serve on the Health and Government Operations Committee and the Joint Committee on Behavioral Health and Opioid Use Disorders. She has served in leadership roles in a number of caucuses in the legislature, including as Secretary of the Legislative Black Caucus of Maryland, on the Executive Committee of the Veteran's Caucus, and on the Executive Board of the Women Legislators of Maryland. She also serves on a number of non-legislative committees and commissions, including the State Council on Cancer Control, the Rural Maryland Council, the Board of Directors of the Maryland Patient Safety Center, the Work Group on Rural Health Care Delivery, and the Virginia Jones Alzheimer's and Related Disorders Council.

Speaker Pro Tem

On January 8, 2020, after serving five years in the Maryland House of Delegates, Sample-Hughes was sworn in as the Speaker Pro Tem of the Maryland House.

References 

1977 births
2020 United States presidential electors
20th-century African-American people
21st-century African-American women
21st-century African-American politicians
21st-century American politicians
21st-century American women politicians
African-American state legislators in Maryland
African-American women in politics
Living people
Democratic Party members of the Maryland House of Delegates
Women state legislators in Maryland
20th-century African-American women